"Got Me Wrong" is a largely acoustic song by the American rock band Alice in Chains, originally featured on the band's 1992 EP, Sap. Written by guitarist and vocalist Jerry Cantrell, who also shared vocals with Layne Staley. A slightly different version of the song also appeared on the soundtrack to the 1994 comedy film Clerks, and is played when the character Randal first appears in the movie. "Got Me Wrong" was released as a single in 1994 after being featured on Clerks. The song was included on the compilation albums Nothing Safe: Best of the Box (1999) and Music Bank (1999). An acoustic version performed on Alice in Chains' MTV Unplugged concert in 1996 was released on a live album and DVD.

Lyrics
In the liner notes of 1999's Music Bank box set collection, guitarist Jerry Cantrell said of the song:
That's about a girl I was dating in between one of the times I broke up with my true love. A lot of times you'll tell someone how you don't want to be in a relationship and why, and what kind of person you are, and they hear all that but think that they can change you. That's what the song's about, getting me wrong and the different ways that men and women see each other.

Release and reception
"Got Me Wrong" was released as a single in 1994, after its appearance in Clerks. "Got Me Wrong" peaked at number seven on the Billboard Mainstream Rock Tracks chart and at number 22 on the Billboard Modern Rock Tracks chart. Both the studio version and the version from Unplugged received significant airplay.

Ned Raggett of Allmusic said that the song "went a long way towards showing how Alice in Chains could work as effectively at low(er) volume as at high" and that "it's almost one of the warmest and most inspiring things the band had yet recorded — musically, at least."

The song continues to get significant airplay on Sirius XM radio's grunge station, Lithium.

Live performances
Alice in Chains guitarist Jerry Cantrell, who wrote the song, also performed it with Stone Temple Pilots on one occasion. Alice in Chains performed an acoustic version of "Got Me Wrong" for its appearance on MTV Unplugged in 1996 and the song was included on the Unplugged live album and home video release. The performance from MTV Unplugged can also be found on Nothing Safe: Best of the Box.

In recent performances without Staley, Cantrell sings lead vocals on the whole song, as opposed to just the choruses. In addition, Staley's replacement, William DuVall, plays the guitar solos throughout the whole song.

Cover versions
This song was covered by the post-grunge band Theory of a Deadman as a b-side for their "Santa Monica" single. A jazz version of the song appears on the pianist Brad Mehldau's 2012 album, Where Do You Start.

Personnel
Layne Staley – vocals
Jerry Cantrell – guitar, vocals
Mike Starr – bass
Sean Kinney – drums, percussion

Chart positions

References

1992 songs
1994 singles
Alice in Chains songs
Songs written by Jerry Cantrell
Song recordings produced by Rick Parashar
Columbia Records singles